The 1899 Currie Cup was the sixth edition of the Currie Cup, the premier domestic rugby union competition in South Africa.

However, the winner of the first five tournaments, did not participate in the 1899 event due to the impending Anglo-Boer War, nor did .

See also

 Currie Cup

References

1899
1899 in South African rugby union
Currie